Staro Petrovo Selo is a village and a municipality in Brod-Posavina County, Croatia. It is located between Nova Gradiška and Slavonski Brod. Its population is 5,186 (2011).

See also
Staro Petrovo Selo railway station

References

Municipalities of Croatia
Populated places in Brod-Posavina County
Slavonia